Arkhipo-Osipovka is a rural locality (a selo) and a Black Sea resort under the jurisdiction of the Town of Gelendzhik in Krasnodar Krai, Russia. Arkhipo-Osipovka (many people call this place Arkhipka) is located 50 kilometers away from the city of Gelendzhik. This place has one of the softest climates on the Russian sea coast. Population: 

The settlement on the shore of the Vulan Bay originated as the Cossack stanitsa of Vulanovskaya in 1864. Some twenty-five years later, it was renamed after Arkhip Osipov, a Russian soldier who had sacrificed his life to save his comrades-in-arms from the onslaught of the Circassians in 1840. Arkhipo-Osipovka had urban-type settlement status until 2004.

The vicinity of Arkhipo-Osipovka contains several waterfalls and the scarce remains of an ancient Roman fortification. The economy is dependent on the Beregovaya compressor station, one of the largest in the world, which is part of the Blue Stream pipeline system which carries natural gas from Russia to Turkey and then to Europe.

References

Rural localities in Krasnodar Krai
Black Sea Governorate
Populated places established in 1864